Christine Mallo (born 26 February 1966 at Orléans) is a French former athlete, who specialized in long-distance running.

She won the French national title in the half marathon in 1995. In 1996, at the IAAF World Half Marathon Championships in Palma de Mallorca, Spain, Mallo placed sixth in the individual event in 1:12:24, and won the silver medal in the team event alongside her compatriots Zahia Dahmani and Muriel Linsolas.

She placed 14th in the marathon at the 1997 IAAF World Championships in Athletics in Athens with the time of 2:40:55.

Her personal best for the marathon, established in 1999, is 2:31:49.

International competitions

Personal bests

References
 
  profile Christine Mallo on the site of the FFA .

1966 births
Living people
French female long-distance runners
French female marathon runners
Sportspeople from Orléans
World Athletics Championships athletes for France